The 2001 Humboldt State Lumberjacks football team represented Humboldt State University during the 2001 NCAA Division II football season. Humboldt State moved back to the NCAA from the NAIA in 2001, and competed as a charter member of the Great Northwest Athletic Conference (GNAC). They had been a member of the NAIA Columbia Football Association (CFA) from 1997 to 2000. The CFA folded after the 2000 season.

The 2001 Lumberjacks were led by second-year head coach Doug Adkins. They played home games at the Redwood Bowl in Arcata, California. Humboldt State finished the season with a record of four wins and seven losses (4–7, 1–2 GNAC). The Lumberjacks were outscored by their opponents 267–405 for the 2001 season. 

Because of the terrorist attacks on September 11, many college football game were rescheduled. As a result, a hole in the Lumberjacks schedule was created. To fill that, a game was added against conference foe Western Oregon was added on October 13, but it did not count as a conference game.

Schedule

References

Humboldt State
Humboldt State Lumberjacks football seasons
Humboldt State Lumberjacks football